Kevin McCann (born 17 December 1980) is a Scottish former footballer who played for Partick Thistle, Dumbarton and East Stirlingshire.

References

1980 births
Scottish footballers
Dumbarton F.C. players
Partick Thistle F.C. players
East Stirlingshire F.C. players
Scottish Football League players
Living people
Association football defenders
Outfield association footballers who played in goal